Lake Anahuac is an artificial lake fed by the Trinity River,  east of downtown Houston, Texas, United States in western Chambers County. The city of Anahuac lies on its eastern shores. It was constructed by the Burkhalter family in 1953.

The lake was once Turtle Bay until the mouth of the bay was closed in the early 1900s. The current dam and levee system was completed in 1954.

References
 

Bodies of water of Chambers County, Texas
Geography of Houston
Galveston Bay Area
Anahuac